PS-88 Malir-II is a constituency of the Provincial Assembly of Sindh.

General elections 2018

See also
 PS-87 Malir-I
 PS-89 Malir-III

References

External links
 Election commission Pakistan's official website
 Awazoday.com check result
 Official Website of Government of Sindh

Constituencies of Sindh